Kim Tserkezie (born 30 July 1973) is a British actress, producer, author and presenter. She is best known for portraying the role of Penny Pocket in BAFTA award winning children's series Balamory and a presenter for BBC's ‘Disability Today’ and BBC2's ‘From The Edge’.

Early life and career
Born in Newcastle upon Tyne, Tserkezie began her television career as a presenter for BBC's Disability Today programme and BBC2's From The Edge programme. She is best known for playing the character of Penny Pocket in the BAFTA award-winning children's television series Balamory (which ran from 2002–2005 and aired on BBC One, BBC Two, and CBeebies).  She also runs her own broadcasting production company called Scattered Pictures.

In 2015, she wrote and published her first ever children’s book, titled ‘The Wheelie Wonderful Life of Millie Monroe’ in a planned series called Toys for Tomorrow.  She won a John Brabourne Award in 2016 and was a board member of the Royal Television Society North East and the Borders 2017-21.

In 2020, she won two Royal Television Society Awards, Best Drama Performance for her role as 'Jasmine', the lead character in the short film, Obsession. She also won a Drama Short Form award with the rest of the team, as she also directed the film. In 2021, Tserkezie was nominated for the Entrepreneur of Excellence Award for her broadcasting work at the National Diversity Awards. 

She has starred in multiple radio documentaries for the BBC World Service. The series were received well across the globe and were chosen as Pick of the Week by the Observer and The Times.  

In 2022, she presented and produced radio documentary series 'Hidden Sport' for the BBC World Service. It was also aired on BBC Sounds.

Tserkezie has been a full BAFTA member since 2014 and is Deputy Chair of BFI’s Disability Screen Advisory Group. She has chaired industry events for RTS, BFI (including at London Film Festival) and for Netflix.  She is a trustee of the North’s leading development agency for writing and reading, New Writing North.

Personal life
Tserkezie was diagnosed with a progressive neuromuscular disorder spinal muscular atrophy as a child and has been a wheelchair user for most of her life. Her website was voted "best representation of a wheelchair user" by children's organisation Whizz Kidz in 2005.  In 2020, she was named as one of the UK's 100 most influential disabled people. 

She married schoolteacher Daniel Tunnicliffe in 2008 and they have two children together, Dan and Stella.

References

External links
 Kim Tserkezie official site
 

1973 births
Living people
20th-century English actresses
21st-century English actresses
Actresses from Newcastle upon Tyne
BBC television presenters
English radio presenters
English television actresses
English television presenters
People with spinal muscular atrophy
British women radio presenters
Television presenters with disabilities